Mollacəlilli (known as Yeni Əlibayramlı until 1999) is a village and municipality in the Goygol Rayon of Azerbaijan. It has a population of 1,805.

References

Populated places in Goygol District